The Middlesex Greenway may refer to:
The Middlesex Greenway (Middlesex), United Kingdom
The Middlesex Greenway (New Jersey), United States